NGC 231 is an open cluster in the Small Magellanic Cloud. It is located in the constellation Tucana. It was discovered on August 1, 1826 by James Dunlop.

References

0231
Open clusters
Small Magellanic Cloud
Tucana (constellation)